Mikhail Nikiforovich Vergeyenko (born 12 January 1950) is a Belarusian association football manager and former goalkeeper who managed the Belarus national football team between 1992 and 1994 and from 1998 to 1999. Vergeyenko also played for Dinamo Minsk between 1 July 1968  and 30 June 1983.

After his second spell with national team he retired from coaching and worked at Football Federation of Belarus for many years until 2011.

His son Aleksey Vergeyenko is also a former footballer and currently works as a coach.

Honours
Dinamo Minsk
Soviet Top League champion: 1982

References

1950 births
Living people
Soviet footballers
Belarusian football managers
Soviet Top League players
FC Dinamo Minsk players
FC Dinamo Minsk managers
Belarus national football team managers
Sportspeople from Gomel
Belarusian footballers
Association football goalkeepers